Manfred Siebald (born 26 October 1948 at Alheim-Baumbach) is a German singer-songwriter and lecturer in American studies in Mainz.

Siebald is best known as a Christian singer-songwriter, who writes and speaks on contemporary worship music. His songs of the genre Neues Geistliches Lied (NGL) have gained a firm place in the songbooks of many different Christian denominations and are sung in fellowships and youth groups throughout Germany.

Artistic and musical career
As a child Manfred Siebald learned to play several musical instruments, including the violin, the viola and the piano. Along with his studies at the University of Marburg he took instruction in harmonisation and singing. As early as 1970 he was conducting the Youth for Christ Choir and singing in the Christ Singers. He also brought out his first single – "Meinst du wirklich, es genügt?" – at that time. In 1972 he published his first solo album, entitled Da steh ich nun. Siebald gained an international following with his performances at Eurofest '75, the international youth conference and evangelistic crusade which was organized by the Billy Graham organisation in Brussels. Siebald has often been compared with the singer-songwriter Reinhard Mey for his style, and sometimes with Graham Kendrick for his influence on Christian music in his country.

Over time he has become the most well-known German Christian singer songwriter, and has influenced many others. This is demonstrated, among other things, by the release of the album In deinem Haus – A Tribute to Manfred Siebald in 2003, consisting of reinterpretations of some of Siebald's best-loved songs by other well-known Christian musicians (such as Michael Janzde from the group Beatbetriebde). The album was arranged by Florian Sitzmannde and produced by Arne Kopfermannde.

Siebald also translates English songs and writes lyrics for other singers. For example, he wrote all the lyrics for Cae Gauntt'sde album Welt von 1000 Wegen. He is frequently asked to write a theme song for special meetings or conferences. This was the case when he wrote "Von deinen Worten können wir leben" (We Can Live Off Your Words) for The Year of the Bible in 1992. To date Siebald has penned about 350 songs, produced 19 albums and published seven poetry books.

Manfred Siebald performs about thirty concerts annually, accompanying himself on various acoustic guitars. For this he travels all over Germany and abroad. For his concerts abroad, including the US, South Africa, and Sri Lanka, he has produced English versions of his songs.

Academic career
In 1967, Siebald graduated from secondary school in Kassel. While on tour in America with the German Youth for Christ Choir, he studied at Manchester College, North Manchester, Indiana, in 1969. He then read German and English philology at Philipps University of Marburg. He trained to be a secondary school teacher of English and German, taking his first state diploma examination in 1972. After his marriage in 1973, he paused his studies for three years, completing his teacher training by taking the second state examination in 1976.

In 1977, he did a PhD in American studies at the Johannes Gutenberg University of Mainz. His dissertation dealt with the topic Auflehnung im Werk Herman Melvilles – Rebellion in Herman Melville's Novels. In 1983, he was made Assistant Professor (tenured) for American Studies at Johannes Gutenberg University and continued his academic work after completion of his PhD. He interrupted his work at Mainz by taking sabbaticals at Wheaton College (Illinois) (Clyde S. Kilby Professor in 1992) and Guest Professor at Georgia State University in Atlanta (1996 and 1997). In the first year (1996), Siebald produced the monograph Der verlorene Sohn in der amerikanischen Literatur – The Prodigal Son in American Literature – which was published in 2003. He was made Associate Professor in American Studies in Mainz in 2002 and has remained there to the present.

Other activities
Manfred Siebald is Curator of the Faith and Science Institute of the Studentenmission in Deutschland (SMD), the German equivalent of the Universities and Colleges Christian Fellowship (UCCF). In 1979, the nationwide television special "Whether My Songs Are Loud or Soft" was broadcast about his work. The same year, he co-founded the Christian arts group Das Rad (The Wheel) in Wetzlar, together with about 50 other Christians also working in the arts.

He is married to a doctor, Christine Siebald (née Stossberg), and they have a son, Benjamin, born in 1984.

In 2008, President Horst Köhler awarded him and his wife the Federal Cross of Merit for their tireless charity work both at home and abroad.

Music

Popular songs 
 „Ins Wasser fällt ein Stein" – "A Stone Drops in the Pond",original text ("It only takes a spark") and music: Kurt Kaiser de(His best-known song in the current German Protestant hymnal )
 „Es geht ohne Gott in die Dunkelheit" – "It's dark without God"
 „In Deinem Haus" – "In your house, Lord"
 „Jesus, zu dir kann ich so kommen wie ich bin" – "I can come to you, Jesus, just as I am"(music: Johannes Nitschde)(This was sung every evening of the ProChristde crusade.)
 „Gut, dass wir einander haben" – "It's good that we've got each other"(song about the advantages of Christian fellowship)
 „Friede sei mit dir" – "Peace be with thee" (benediction)
 „Du bist mein Rabe" – "You are my raven" (love song)
 „Über Nacht" – "Over night"(song about the fall of the Berlin Wall and German reunification 1989/90)
 „Mit federleichter Hand" – "With a Soft Touch" (love song)
 „Wenn der Mund stumm ist" – "If I hold my tongue"(song about the September 11, 2001 attacks)
 „Die Weihnachtsfreude" – "Christmas joy"(A well-known carol, used as the theme tune for the cartoon Die Stadt, die Weihnachten vergaß – The Town That Forgot Christmas.)
 „Wenn wir Gott in der Höhe ehren" – "If we glorify God in the Highest" (Christmas carol)

Discography

Single 
 "Meinst du wirklich, es genügt?" (1970)Do you really mean, it's enough?"

Vinyl albums
 Da steh ich nun (1972)Here I stand
 Ich gehe weiter (1974)I'll press on
 Das ungedüngte Feld (1976)A Field of organic foodsee: discussion
 Zeitpunkte (1978)Points in Time
 Überall hat Gott seine Leute (1983) ("Manfred Siebald and Friends")God has his people everywhereThe title comes from Manfred's translation of Andrae Crouch's song "Through it all".
 Kreuzschnabel (1985)Crossbill
 Alles auf seine Weise – Liebeslieder (1986)Everything in its own way – Love songs

Compact discs
 Gib mir die richtigen Worte (1987) (Sampler)Words that are wise and yet simplesee: discussion
 Spuren (1988)Traces
 Von Wegen (1991)No Way
 Amasement(Instrumentals arranged by Tom Keene)
 Du bist mein Rabe – Lieder von der Liebe (1993)You are my raven – Love songs
 Worte wie Brot – Lieder für den Gottesdienst (1994) ("Manfred Siebald and friends")Words like bread – Worship songs
 Lass uns Freunde sein (Songs for children)(1996) ("Manfred Siebald and children")Let's Be Friends
 Nicht vergessen (1998)Not Forgotten
 Weltbewegende Winzigkeiten (2000)Little Things That Make the World Go Round
 Was die Engel uns sagen (2000) ("Manfred Siebald and friends") – Songs for ChristmasWhat the angels tell us
 Vielleicht kommst du mit (2001)Maybe you'll come along
 Morgenmantelmorgen (2004)Dressing Gown Morning
 Singen Sie bald mit? (2005) (Sampler) Manfred Siebald's congregational songsWill you sing along?
 Ich lass dich nicht fallen (2006)I won't let you fall
 The first four vinyl albums have been re-released on compact disc as a 4-CD pack.

Publications
For an extensive list of the academic publications see

Poetry books
Ist schon alles gesagt (1976) Poetry collection Has Everything Been Said?
Worauf noch warten (1980) Poetry collection Why Wait
Kreuzschnabel (1983) Poetry collection Crossbill (with woodcuts by Andreas Felgerde)
Wir brauchen Mut (1992) Poetry collection We Need Courage
Lehn dich zurück (1992) Poetry collection Lean Back
Von den Augen abgelesen (1993) Book of poetry Read My Eyes
Du bist mein Rabe (1993) Book of poetry You Are my Raven (with Christine Siebald)

Other books
Auflehnung im Werk Herman Melvilles — Rebellion in Herman Melville's Novels (1979) (dissertation)
Eine Handvoll schöner Gedanken Collection of aphorisms – A handful of beautiful thoughts (1985)
Das Leben ist eine Boulebahn – Life is a bowling alley (2003)
Der verlorene Sohn in der amerikanischen Literatur – The prodigal son in American literature (2003) (Monograph)
Die ganze Weite: Ein Amerika-Lesebuch. – The big picture: An American primer (2004)
Gib mir den richtigen Ton. Lauter Liedergeschichten – Give me the right sound. Stories of famous songs (2006)
Dorothy L. Sayers: Leben – Werk – Gedanken. – Her life, work and thoughts (2007)
Pitti lächelt und andere Geschichten – Pitti smiled and other stories (2008)

Articles
Amerikanisierung des Dramas und Dramatisierung Amerikas – Americanisation of Drama and Dramatisation of America (1985)Marriage Studies by Hans Helmcke, contributions by Horst Immel and Manfred Siebald.
"Salt of the Earth." Article in A Dictionary of Biblical Tradition in English Literature. David Lyle Jeffrey, general editor. Grand Rapids: W.B. Eerdmans, 1992..

References

External links
 
 Official web site in German and English
 Article by Radio Khwezi, South Africa in English
 Transcription of an interview on the Bavarian Radio Alpha Forum on 8 June 2007 in German
 Academic CV (Resumé) link dead – 14 September 2009

1948 births
Living people
People from Hersfeld-Rotenburg
University of Marburg alumni
Academic staff of Johannes Gutenberg University Mainz
German songwriters
German male singers
German singer-songwriters
German performers of Christian music
Recipients of the Cross of the Order of Merit of the Federal Republic of Germany
Wheaton College (Illinois) faculty